Bart Van Den Eede (born 3 November 1977) is a Belgian former professional footballer who played as a forward for Beveren, FC Den Bosch, NAC Breda, Willem II, NEC, Westerlo, Dender, Eindhoven and Mariekerke.

References
 
  Profile

1977 births
Living people
People from Hamme
Belgian footballers
Belgium youth international footballers
Association football forwards
K.S.K. Beveren players
FC Den Bosch players
NAC Breda players
Willem II (football club) players
NEC Nijmegen players
K.V.C. Westerlo players
F.C.V. Dender E.H. players
FC Eindhoven players
Belgian Pro League players
Challenger Pro League players
Eredivisie players
Eerste Divisie players
Belgian expatriate footballers
Expatriate footballers in the Netherlands
Belgian expatriate sportspeople in the Netherlands
Footballers from East Flanders